Sarfarosh also called Brave Hearts was a 1930 Indian silent film directed by A. R. Kardar. Made as action adventure film based on the RKO dramas, it was produced by Kardar's production company, "Playart Phototone". According to Hameeduddin Mahmood, the films had double titles up until the mid-1930s; the Hindi/Urdu name for the home market (India), and the English name for the overseas market. Kardar gave up acting after having starred in Husn Ka Daku (1929) and cast Gul Hamid in the main role. He also gave Rafiqe Ghaznavi a break as an actor in the film. Ghaznavi went on to become a famous music director.

The cinematographer was K. V. Machve, and the actors were Gul Hamid, Ghulam Qadir, Miss Gulzar, Rafiqe Ghaznavi and Mumtaz.

Cast
 Gul Hamid
 Ghulam Qadir
 Hiralal
 Miss Gulzar
 Mumtaz
 Rafiq Gazanavi

Release
The film, like Husn Ka Daku (1929) was released at Deepak Cinema, in the Bhati Gate area of Lahore. The film was made in thirty weeks and made "1,170 rupees, 2 annas and 6 paisa", making it the "Most successful" film until that time.

References

External links

1930 films
Lollywood
Indian silent films
Films directed by A. R. Kardar
Indian black-and-white films